Dungannon Rovers Football Club was an intermediate-level football club that played in the Mid-Ulster Football League in Northern Ireland. They now play in the Daily Mirror Mid Ulster League Division 3. The club is based in Dungannon, County Tyrone. The club played in the Irish Cup.

References

External links
 Daily Mirror Mid-Ulster Football League Official website
 nifootball.co.uk - (For fixtures, results and tables of all Northern Ireland amateur football leagues)

Association football clubs in County Tyrone
Mid-Ulster Football League clubs
Association football clubs established in 2001
Association football clubs disestablished in 2017
2001 establishments in Northern Ireland
2017 disestablishments in Northern Ireland
Defunct association football clubs in Northern Ireland